Muskaan Nancy James (also called Nancy James) is an Indian television actress.

Television

References

Living people
Indian television actresses
Year of birth missing (living people)
Place of birth missing (living people)